The 2003–04 Top League was the first season of Japan's domestic rugby union competition, the Top League. Toshiba Brave Lupus won the league by finishing on top of the round-robin competition.

Toshiba Brave Lupus lost the final of Microsoft Cup to NEC Green Rockets, but the cup was considered a separate competition to the Top League prior to 2007.

Teams

Top League season

Final standings

Fixtures and results

Microsoft Cup play-offs
The top eight teams in the league played off for the Microsoft Cup (2004) knock out tournament, which was won by NEC Green Rockets.

Quarter-finals

Semi-finals

Final

Top League Challenge Series

IBM Big Blue and Toyota Verblitz won promotion to the 2004–05 Top League via the 2004 Top League Challenge Series, while Kyuden Voltex and Toyota Industries Shuttles progressed to the promotion play-offs.

Promotion and relegation play-offs
Two promotion/relegation matches (Irekaesen) were played with the winners qualifying for the 2004–05 Top League. The 10th-placed team from the Top League against the 3rd-placed team from Challenge 1. The 9th-placed team from the Top League against the 1st-placed team from Challenge 2.

So Kinetsu and Ricoh stayed in the Top League for the 2004–05 season.

References

External links

Top League
Top League
Japan Rugby League One
Top